Mojtaba Moghtadaei (born 20 March 1996) is an Iranian footballer who plays as a right back who currently plays for Iranian club Naft Masjed Soleyman in the Persian Gulf Pro League.

Club career

Zob Ahan
He made his debut for Zob Ahan in 6th fixtures of 2018–19 Iran Pro League against Padideh while he substituted in for Milad Fakhreddini.

References

1996 births
Living people
Iranian footballers
Zob Ahan Esfahan F.C. players
Association football defenders
People from Abadan, Iran
Sportspeople from Khuzestan province